Frank Bowden (1908–1977) was an American tennis player. This is how Allison Danzig of The New York Times described Bowden's playing style "His service was a veritable lightning bolt and if the ball came back, he was up to the net to smother the return with his volleys and kills. His hard forehand and sweeping backhand kept the ball deep to crowd his opponent in the corners and pave the way for successful forages at close quarters". Bowden made his debut in the U. S. championships in 1930 and lost in round two. At the 1931 U.S. Championships, Bowden caused the "biggest upset of the year" by beating Wimbledon champion Sidney Wood in the third round.  According to Bill Tilden "Sidney allowed himself to be drawn in.  He had to come in because Bowden was shortening up. And once Sidney came up, he left himself wide open for that shot down the sideline or a smart rap across court". Wood admitted afterwards "I was afraid to go to the net". Bowden lost in the quarterfinals to Fred Perry. Bowden continued to play in the U. S. championships until 1947, reaching the last 16 in 1935 and 1940. Bowden was three times a finalist in the national indoor championships (losing the 1937 final to Frank Parker, the 1938 final to Don McNeill and the 1939 final to Wayne Sabin). After serving as a 2nd lieutenant in the US Army in WW2, in Papua New Guinea, and Philippines, he worked as a statistician for the New York Telephone Company.

References

1908 births
1977 deaths
American male tennis players
Tennis people from New York (state)